Gyzylgaya is a town in Türkmenbaşy District, Balkan Province, Turkmenistan.

Climate

Transport 

It is a stop on the North-South Transnational Corridor.

See also 
 Railway stations in Turkmenistan

References

Populated places in Balkan Region
Geography of Turkmenistan